Claude R. LeBrun (born 1956) is an American mathematician who holds the position of Distinguished Professor of Mathematics at Stony Brook University. Much of his research concerns the Riemannian geometry of 4-manifolds, or related topics in complex and differential geometry.

LeBrun earned his D.Phil. (Oxford equivalent of a Ph.D.) from the University of Oxford in 1980, under the supervision of Roger Penrose, and in the same year took a faculty position at Stony Brook. Since then, he has also held positions at
the Institut des Hautes Études Scientifiques, the Mathematical Sciences Research Institute, and the Institute for Advanced Study.

He is the namesake of the LeBrun manifolds, a family of self-dual manifolds that he discovered in 1989 and that was named after him by Michael Atiyah and Edward Witten. LeBrun is also known for his work on Einstein manifolds and the Yamabe invariant. In particular, he produced examples showing that the converse of the Hitchin–Thorpe inequality does not hold: there exist infinitely many four-dimensional compact smooth simply connected manifolds that obey the inequality but do not admit Einstein metrics.

LeBrun was an invited speaker at the 1994 International Congress of Mathematicians. In 2012, he became a Fellow of the American Mathematical Society. In 2016, a conference in his honor was held in Montreal.
In 2018, he became a Simons Foundation Fellow in Mathematics. In 2020, he was appointed as Distinguished Professor at the State University of New York.

References

Living people
20th-century American mathematicians
Rice University alumni
Alumni of the University of Oxford
Stony Brook University faculty
Fellows of the American Mathematical Society
Differential geometers
1956 births
21st-century American mathematicians